Thomas Leer (born Thomas Wishart, 1953, Port Glasgow, Scotland) is a Scottish musician. He has released a number of albums and singles as a solo artist, and was also one half (the other being Claudia Brücken) of the 1980s electropop band Act.

Biography
Born in Port Glasgow, Scotland, Leer played in several local experimental pop groups in the early to mid-1970s, moving to London when the punk rock scene was at its height. He formed the punk band Pressure, but by 1978 had moved on to music influenced by synthpop and Krautrock bands such as Can. That year, he self-financed his debut single, "Private Plane". Although it was recorded in his own flat and was only issued in 650 copies on his own label, it gained significant attention, with NME naming it "Single of the Week". (It was also included in the fantastic compilation album Business As Usual, on Cherry Red/CRI.) In 1979, he released the album The Bridge in collaboration with Robert Rental. In 1981, he signed to Cherry Red, his first release for the label being the 4 Movements EP. After two further releases on the label, he was signed by Arista Records, releasing three further singles and his debut full-length solo album, The Scale of Ten in late 1985.

Two years later, he formed the duo Act along with ex-Propaganda singer Claudia Brücken, signing to ZTT Records. The duo released four singles (including the minor UK hit "Snobbery and Decay") and an album, Laughter, Tears and Rage, before splitting up, with Brücken pursuing a solo career. Leer retired at this point, but returned in 2003 with a new album and in 2009 on the track "Tonight", from the Stefano Panunzi album A Rose and continues to be musically active.

Discography

Albums
 The Bridge (1979), Industrial (with Robert Rental) – UK Indie No. 9, reissued (1992), Mute/Grey Area
 Contradictions (1982), Cherry Red – UK Indie No. 8, double 12-inch mini-LP
 Letter from America (1982), Cherry Red/Cachalot – double 12-inch LP
 The Scale of Ten (1985), Arista – reissued on CD in expanded form (2004), BMG
 Conversation Peace (2003), Avatar
 Parts of a Greater Hole (2004), Karvavena
 From Sci-Fi to Barfly (2007), Future Historic – digital only release, CD release on Klanggalerie, 2015
 1982 (2015), Future Historic – digital only release, previously unreleased material except for one track, CD release on Klanggalerie, 2018
 1991 (2015), Future Historic – digital only release, previously unreleased material
 1979 (2016), Future Historic – digital only release, previously unreleased material, CD release on Klanggalerie/LP release on Dark Entries, both 2017
 Reaching Never Quite (2018), Future Historic - digital only release of new material
 Emotional Hardware (2020), Smitten Kitten CD Release
Compilations
Contradictions - The Cherry Red Collection (1994), Cherry Red

Singles
 "Private Plane/International" (1978), Oblique
 4 Movements EP (1981), Cherry Red – UK Indie No. 39
 "All About You" (1982), Cherry Red – UK Indie No. 11
 "International" (1984), Arista
 "Heartbeat" (1985), Arista
 "No 1" (1985), Arista

See also 
 List of ambient music artists

References

External links
 Leer's official site
 Thomas Leer Myspace
 Leer biography by Ian Peel
 Thomas Leer info at Discogs
 Zang Tuum Tumb and all that

1953 births
Living people
Scottish rock singers
British rock keyboardists
Scottish new wave musicians
British synth-pop new wave musicians
Male new wave singers
People from Port Glasgow
Cherry Red Records artists
Industrial Records artists